Every Night at Eight is a 1935 American comedy musical film starring George Raft and Alice Faye and made by Walter Wanger Productions Inc. and Paramount Pictures.  It was directed by Raoul Walsh and produced by Walter Wanger from a screenplay by C. Graham Baker, Bert Hanlon and Gene Towne based on the  story Three On a Mike by Stanley Garvey.

The song "I'm in the Mood for Love" was introduced in this film by Frances Langford. "I Feel a Song Coming On" was performed by Harry Barris and band and reprised by Alice Faye, Frances Langford and Patsy Kelly, and also sung by James Miller with chorus.

Plot
The film involves a trio of young female singers trying to break into show business. Three young women working in an agency named Daphne O' Connor, Dixie Foley, and Susan Moore (Patsy Kelly, Alice Faye, and Frances Langford) have built a singing trio. They want to 'lease' the Dictaphone of their boss, Mr. Huxley (John Dilson) to make a record of their singing, but they are caught and fired. When they are not able to pay their rent any longer, they decide to try their luck on an amateur contest at a radio station, hosted by a Major Bowes-type named Colonel Dave (Walter Catlett). Several talents approach the microphone, including The Radio Rogues, an Italian who sings opera terribly, and an elderly chicken impersonator aptly named Henrietta (Florence Gill).

Due to lack of food, Susan becomes unconscious while singing and the contest is won by a blue-collar big band led by Tops Cardona (George Raft). They become involved with Tops after he is impressed by Susan's singing at a café run by a German named Joe Schmidt (Herman Bing). Tops offers them a job with his band at the radio station. They accept, are christened The Swanee Sisters by Tops to give them a southern flavor, and he buys them matching outfits. Tops and the girls soon become a nationwide hit once they land a sponsor (who happens to be their old boss, Mr. Huxley), but after a while, they grow tired of working constantly and not having any fun, and leave the band indefinitely. Daphne insists they attend the party (in the furs Tops bought for them), leaving Tops to fend for himself.

They accept an invitation to appear at a party held on a yacht by a Mrs. Reginald Herring-Smthye (Claudia Coleman). After meeting several unsavory rich people at the soiree, and feeling a bit sour after mixing with the "creme de la creme", they adjourn to an anteroom with a radio in it. Tops is on the air without them, and he tells everyone listening in that they are absent and how much he misses them, hoping they will to return to him. The girls soon realize they can't go on without him and return to the band.

Cast
 George Raft as Tops Cardona
 Alice Faye as Dixie Foley
 Patsy Kelly as Daphne O'Connor
 Frances Langford as Susan Moore
 Walter Catlett as the Master of Ceremonies (M.C.)
 Herman Bing as Joe Schmidt
 John Dilson as Huxley
 Louise Carver as Mrs. Snyder
 Claud Allister as Mr. Vernon
 Harry Holman as Col. Ratchfield
 Florence Gill as Henrietta
 Harry Barris as Harry
Claudia Coleman as Mrs. Reginald Herring-Smythe

Production
Alice Faye was cast in April 1935. Filming began the following month. It was completed by the end of June.

Songs
All songs with music by Jimmy McHugh, and lyrics by Dorothy Fields and George Oppenheimer except where noted.

"Take It Easy"
"Speaking Confidentially"
"Then You've Never Been Blue" (Ted Fio Rito/Frances Langford/Sam M. Lewis)
"Every Night at Eight"
"I Feel a Song Coming On"
"I'm in the Mood For Love"

Reception
The film made a profit of $148,782.

Filmink said Raft was "very animated".

References

External links
 

Films directed by Raoul Walsh
1935 films
Paramount Pictures films
1935 musical comedy films
American musical comedy films
American black-and-white films
1930s English-language films
1930s American films